Robert Coello (born November 23, 1984) is an American former professional baseball pitcher. He played in Major League Baseball (MLB) for the Boston Red Sox, Toronto Blue Jays, and Los Angeles Angels of Anaheim, and in the KBO League for the Nexen Heroes.

Professional career
Coello attended Lake Region High School in Eagle Lake, Florida and Northwest Florida State College.  He was drafted by the Cincinnati Reds in the 20th round of the 2004 Major League Baseball Draft. He then played for the Los Angeles Angels of Anaheim Arizona League team in 2007.

Boston Red Sox
After playing for Edmonton of the independent Golden Baseball League in 2008, he signed with the Boston Red Sox organization for the 2009 season. Coello made his major league debut September 2010 with Boston and had a 4.76 ERA in six relief outings. He was designated for assignment by the Red Sox on February 9, 2011. In three minor league seasons he posted a record of 13–10 with a 2.91 ERA.

Chicago Cubs
On February 15, 2011, the Red Sox traded Coello to the Chicago Cubs for minor league second baseman Tony Thomas. The Cubs designated him for assignment on May 27, 2011.

Toronto Blue Jays
On December 9, 2011, Coello signed a minor league contract with the Toronto Blue Jays. He spent most of 2012 pitching for the Blue Jays' Triple-A affiliate, going 4–1 with a 3.00 ERA in 19 games (three starts). He was placed on the 40-man roster on May 31, 2012. He made six appearances for the Blue Jays in 2012, giving up 12 earned runs in 12 innings. On October 9, the Blue Jays reinstated Coello from the 60-day disabled list, and outrighted him off their 40-man roster. According to the Jays transaction page, Coello refused the assignment and elected free agency.

Los Angeles Angels of Anaheim
On January 28, 2013, he was signed a to a Minor League contract with an invitation to big league Spring Training by the Los Angeles Angels of Anaheim. He was outrighted off the roster on October 8, 2013.

New York Yankees
Coello signed a minor league deal with the New York Yankees on January 8, 2014. He opted out of his deal on July 2, 2014.

Baltimore Orioles
On July 11, Coello signed a minor league deal with the Baltimore Orioles.

San Francisco Giants
Coello signed a minor league deal with the San Francisco Giants with an opt out clause by June 1. Coello exercised his opt out clause and became a free agent on June 1. Prior to his release, Coello had been pitching as a starter in AAA, starting 11 games for the River Cats.

Texas Rangers
Coello signed a minor league contract with the Texas Rangers in August 2015.

Nexen Heroes
Coello signed a one-year $550,000 contract with the Nexen Heroes of the Korea Baseball Organization in December 2015. He was waived on June 16, 2016, when the team signed Scott McGregor.

Minor Leagues
In his six-year Minor League career, Coello has compiled a 3.33 ERA in 171 games (31 starts), posting a rate of 9.9 strikeouts per nine innings, 3.9 walks per nine innings and a 1.23 WHIP.

Repertoire
Coello developed a forkball to go along with his fastball and changeup. He has nicknamed his forkball "The WTF" because of its unusual movement.

References

External links

, or Retrosheet

1984 births
Living people
Algodoneros de Guasave players
American expatriate baseball players in Canada
American expatriate baseball players in South Korea
Arizona League Angels players
Arkansas Travelers players
Baseball players from Florida
Baseball players from New Jersey
Boston Red Sox players
Calgary Vipers players
Edmonton Cracker-Cats players
Iowa Cubs players
Las Vegas 51s players
Los Angeles Angels players
Major League Baseball pitchers
Navegantes del Magallanes players
American expatriate baseball players in Venezuela
KBO League pitchers
Kiwoom Heroes players
Norfolk Tides players
Northwest Florida State Raiders baseball players
Pawtucket Red Sox players
People from Polk County, Florida
Portland Sea Dogs players
Round Rock Express players
Sacramento River Cats players
Salem Red Sox players
Salt Lake Bees players
Scranton/Wilkes-Barre RailRiders players
Sportspeople from Bayonne, New Jersey
Tennessee Smokies players
Tiburones de La Guaira players
Tigres del Licey players
American expatriate baseball players in the Dominican Republic
Tomateros de Culiacán players
American expatriate baseball players in Mexico
Toronto Blue Jays players